Lea Meadows is a   nature reserve east of Markfield in Leicestershire. It is owned and managed by the Leicestershire and Rutland Wildlife Trust. It is part of the Ulverscroft Valley, which is a Site of Special Scientific Interest, and part of it is a scheduled monument.

Over 240 species of plants have been recorded on these unimproved marshy meadows, and there is a stream which has white-clawed crayfish and brook lampreys, both of which are legally protected. Part of the site is surrounded by a medieval moat.

There is access from Ulverscroft Lane.

References

Leicestershire and Rutland Wildlife Trust